The Estonian Provincial Government was in office in Estonia from 2–3 August 1917 to 1918, when it was succeeded by Estonian Provisional Government. This provincial government was the executive body for Autonomous Governorate of Estonia.

Members

References

Cabinets of Estonia